James Frederick Rodgers (September 18, 1933 – January 18, 2021) was an American singer and actor. Rodgers had a run of hits and mainstream popularity in the 1950s and 1960s. His string of crossover singles ranked highly on the Billboard Pop Singles, Hot Country and Western Sides, and Hot Rhythm and Blues Sides charts; in the 1960s, Rodgers had more modest successes with adult contemporary music.

He was not related to country music pioneer Jimmie C. Rodgers (1897–1933), who died the same year the younger Rodgers was born. Among country audiences, and in his official songwriting credits, the younger Rodgers, Jimmie Frederick, was often credited as Jimmie F. Rodgers to differentiate the two.

Career

Early Years
Rodgers was born in Camas, Washington.  He was the second son of Archie and Mary Rodgers.  Rodgers was taught music by his mother, a piano teacher, and began performing as a child, first entertaining at a Christmas show when he was only five. He learned to play the piano and guitar, and performed locally.

After attending Camas High School, he briefly took courses at Clark Junior College in Vancouver, Washington. He later went to work in a paper mill.  Although he loved music, he was uncertain whether he could turn it into a career. He was subsequently drafted and served in the United States Air Force during the Korean War.

1950s 
While in the Air Force, Rodgers joined a band called "The Melodies" started by violinist Phil Clark. During his service, he was transferred to Nashville, where he was stationed at Sewart Air Force Base from 1954-1956. It was during this time that he began expanding his musical repertoire.  While he was in Nashville, he first heard the song that would become his first hit, "Honeycomb".

Like a number of other entertainers of the era, he was one of the contestants on Arthur Godfrey's talent show on CBS television, winning $700.  When Hugo Peretti and Luigi Creatore left RCA Victor for Morris Levy's company, Roulette Records, they became aware of Rodgers' talent and signed him to a recording contract.

In the summer of 1957, he recorded his own version of "Honeycomb", which had been written by Bob Merrill and recorded by Georgie Shaw three years earlier.  The tune was Rodgers' biggest hit, staying on the top of the charts for four weeks. It sold over one million copies, and was awarded a gold disc by the RIAA. Over the following year he had a number of other hits that reached the Top 10 on the charts: "Kisses Sweeter than Wine"; "Oh-Oh, I'm Falling in Love Again"; "Secretly"; and "Are You Really Mine". Other hits include "Bo Diddley", "Bimbombey", "Ring-a-ling-a-lario", "Tucumcari", "Tender Love and Care (T.L.C)", and a version of Waltzing Matilda as a film tie-in with the apocalyptic movie  On the Beach in 1959

In the United Kingdom, "Honeycomb" reached number 30 in the UK Singles Chart in November 1957, but "Kisses Sweeter than Wine" climbed to number 7 the following month. Both "Kisses Sweeter than Wine" and "Oh-Oh, I'm Falling in Love Again" were million sellers.

The success of "Honeycomb" earned Rodgers guest appearances on numerous variety programs during 1957, including the "Shower of Stars" program, hosted by Jack Benny, on October 31, 1957, and the Big Record with Patti Page, on December 4, 1957.  Rodgers also made several appearances on the Ed Sullivan Show, including on September 8, 1957, when he was seen by 48,500,000, the largest television audience of his entire career, and November 3, 1957.  In 1958, he appeared on NBC's The Gisele MacKenzie Show. Also in 1958, he sang the opening theme song of the film The Long, Hot Summer, starring Paul Newman, Joanne Woodward and Orson Welles. He then had his own short-lived televised variety show on NBC in 1959.

1960s 
His biggest hit in the UK was "English Country Garden", a version of the folk song "Country Gardens", which reached number 5 in the chart in June 1962.  In 1962, he moved to the Dot label, and four years later to A&M Records. He also appeared in some films, including The Little Shepherd of Kingdom Come, opposite Neil Hamilton, and Back Door to Hell, which he helped finance.

In 1966, a long dry spell ended for Rodgers when he re-entered the Top 40 with "It's Over" (later to be recorded by Eddy Arnold, Elvis Presley, Glen Campbell, Mason Williams, and Sonny James). In 1967, he changed record labels, signing with A&M Records. It was with that label that Rodgers had his final charting Top 100 single, "Child of Clay", written by Ernie Maresca, (who had a top-40 hit back in 1962, "Shout! Shout! (Knock Yourself Out)".)  He performed the song on several television variety shows, including The Smothers Brothers Comedy Hour, but it never became a big hit; it only reached number 31 on the Billboard charts.

Later career
Recovery from injuries sustained mysteriously on a highway in 1967 caused an approximately year-long period in which Rodgers ceased to perform. Meanwhile, his voice was still being heard: several of his earlier hits were used in jingles in the 1970s, one for SpaghettiOs and another for Honeycomb breakfast cereal. And Rodgers' songs continued to make the Billboard Country and Easy Listening charts until 1979. During the summer of 1969, he made a brief return to network television with a summer variety show  on ABC (which later bought the rights to Rodgers' Dot Records releases, now owned by Universal Music Group). It was not until the early 1980s when he began doing some limited live appearances again. Among the earliest was a series of shows in late February 1983: he performed at Harrah's Reno Casino Cabaret. He also performed a few shows in other cities, including at a nightclub called Mister Days in Fort Lauderdale, Florida in late 1983.

Rodgers appeared in a 1999 video, Rock & Roll Graffiti by American Public Television, along with about 20 other performers. Nevertheless, he gave "Honeycomb" a try, and he mentioned that he had a show in Branson, Missouri.

Rodgers returned to his hometown of Camas, Washington in 2011 and 2012, performing to sell-out crowds. In 2013, his neighbors successfully got a street named after him, in the neighborhood where he grew up.

Head injuries
On December 1, 1967, Rodgers suffered traumatic head injuries after the car he was driving was stopped by an off-duty police officer near the San Diego Freeway in Los Angeles. He had a fractured skull and required several surgeries. Initial reports in the newspapers attributed his injuries to a severe beating with a blunt instrument by unknown assailants. Rodgers had no specific memory of how he had been injured, remembering only that he had seen blindingly bright lights from a car pulling up behind him.

A few days later, the Los Angeles Police Department (LAPD) stated that off-duty LAPD officer Michael Duffy (at times identified in the press as Richard Duffy) had stopped him for erratic driving, and that Rodgers had stumbled, fallen and hit his head. According to the police version, Duffy then called for assistance from two other officers, and the three of them put the unconscious Rodgers into his car and left the scene. That account was supported by the treating physicians, who had first blamed the skull fracture on a beating but, by the latter part of December, they concluded that Rodgers had in fact fallen and that had caused his injuries.

Lawsuits 
The following month, Rodgers filed an $11 million lawsuit against the City of Los Angeles, claiming that the three officers had beaten him. The police and the L.A. County District Attorney rejected these claims, although the three officers (identified in the press as Michael T. Duffy, 27; Raymond V. Whisman, 29, and Ronald D. Wagner, 32) were given two-week suspensions for improper procedures in handling the case, particularly their leaving the injured Rodgers alone in his car. (He was later found by a worried friend.) Duffy had had a previous four-day suspension for using unnecessary force; he had used a blackjack on a juvenile.

The three officers and the LA Fire and Police Protective League filed a $13 million slander suit against Rodgers for his public statements accusing them of brutality.

Neither suit came to trial; the police slander suit was dropped, and in 1973 Rodgers elected to accept a $200,000 settlement from the Los Angeles City Council, which voted to give him the money rather than to incur the costs and risks of further court action. Rodgers and his supporters still believe that one or more of the police officers beat him, although other observers find the evidence inconclusive. In his 2010 biography Me, the Mob, and the Music, singer Tommy James wrote that Morris Levy, the Mafia-connected head of Roulette Records, had arranged the attack in response to Rodgers' repeated demands for unpaid royalties he was due by the label. All of Rodgers' most successful singles had been released by Roulette, who were notorious for not paying their artists for their record sales.

In 1993, Raymond Virgil Whisman, one of the three officers who were alleged to have assaulted Rodgers, was arrested for assaulting his wife and threatening to kill her.  The arrest occurred after sheriff's deputies stormed his house after being informed that he was holding his wife at gunpoint. Deputies found 11 rifles, four shotguns, and two handguns in the home.  Whisman was charged with two counts of assault and two counts of making terroristic threats.

Publication 
In 2010, Rodgers wrote and published his autobiography, Dancing on the Moon: The Jimmie Rodgers Story.

Personal life 
Rodgers and his first wife Colleen (née McClatchey) divorced in 1970, and she died May 20, 1977.  They had two children, Michael and Michele. He had remarried in 1970, and Jimmie and Trudy Rodgers had two sons, Casey and Logan. He and Trudy divorced in the late 1970s, and he remarried again. Jimmie and Mary Rodgers were still married when he died, and they have a daughter, Katrine, who was born in 1989.

Rodgers suffered from spasmodic dysphonia for a number of years and could hardly sing. After a 2012 concert, he returned home for open heart surgery, following a heart attack he had suffered three weeks earlier. 

Rodgers died from kidney disease on January 18, 2021, at the age of 87. He had also tested positive for COVID-19 in the time before his death, according to his publicist.

Discography

Albums

Singles

1950s

1960s

 A"Tomorrow Is My Friend" also peaked at #28 on RPM Adult Contemporary.

1970s

Films
Rodgers parlayed his singing fame into a brief movie career with lead performances in:
 The Little Shepherd of Kingdom Come (1961)
 Back Door to Hell (1964)
Jimmie sang the song entitled "Half Sung Song" in the 1977 comedy film The Billion Dollar Hobo, starring Tim Conway.

Television
 TV appearances included performances on American Bandstand, Kraft Music Hall, and Hootenanny, as well as the following:
 Hee Haw ...Himself (2 episodes, November 25, 1979 and November 3, 1980)
 The George Burns Show ...Himself; Jimmie Rodgers Moves in with Ronnie (1 episode, March 3, 1959). When Jimmie Rodgers moves in with Ronnie, the apartment is suddenly overrun with pretty young groupies, so a jealous Judi turns to George for help.
 The Mike Douglas Show ...Himself (2 episodes, May 15 and May 21, 1970)
 The Merv Griffin Show ...Himself (1 episode, May 5, 1970)
 The Andy Williams Show ...Himself (1 episode, January 24, 1970)
 House Party, aka Art Linkletter's House Party ...Himself (1 episode, August 24, 1964)
 The Ford Show, Starring Tennessee Ernie Ford . . . Himself (Several appearances, 1959–1960)
 Sunday Showcase, aka NBC Sunday Showcase - The Jimmy Durante Show (1959) ...Himself (1 episode, 1959)
 The Steve Allen Show, aka The Steve Allen Plymouth Show (U.S.: new title)......Himself - Singer (2 episodes, Nos 4.31/4.4 - 1958-1959)
 Toast of the Town, aka The Ed Sullivan Show (U.S.: new title)......Himself (4 episodes, Nos. 0.50/11.6/11/18/11.36 - 1957-1958)
 The 30th Annual Academy Awards (1958) ...Himself - Performer
 Shower of Stars ...Himself (1 episode, Comedy Time - 1957)
 The Jimmie Rodgers Show TV Series, aka Carol Burnett Presents the Jimmie Rodgers Show

In the mid-1960s, he re-recorded (with altered tunes and words referring to the products) two of his best-known songs, for use in television advertisements:
 "Honeycomb" was adapted for a Post Cereals product called "Honeycomb".
 "Oh-Oh, I'm Falling in Love Again" was adapted for one of Franco-American's pasta products: "Uh-Oh, SpaghettiO's!"

References

External links
 
 
 Jimmie Rodgers at Find a Grave
 
 Entry at 45cat.com
 Bsnpubs.com
 
 Interview with Jimmie Rodgers – The Spectrum, May, 2016.
 Interview with Jimmie Rodgers - NAMM Oral History Program, October, 2002.

1933 births
2021 deaths
American folk guitarists
American male guitarists
American rock guitarists
American male pop singers
Traditional pop music singers
Singers from Washington (state)
Dot Records artists
Apex Records artists
Roulette Records artists
A&M Records artists
People from Camas, Washington
Guitarists from Washington (state)
20th-century American guitarists
20th-century American pianists
American male pianists
21st-century American pianists
20th-century American male musicians
21st-century American male musicians
United States Air Force personnel of the Korean War